The Africa CEO Forum is a company created and owned by Jeune Afrique Media Group. With the IFC, it co-organizes an event dedicated to African private sector actors.

Considered as the "Davos of Africa," the Africa CEO Forum has been bringing together business leaders, investors, policy makers and journalists of all countries every year since 2012.

The Africa CEO Forum also produces geographic and sectoral events as well as a virtual variation of its event concepts since 2020.

References 

2012 establishments in Africa